Wittman is a surname. Notable people with the surname include:

Baldy Wittman (born c. 1871), professional football player for the Massillon Tigers
Brian Wittman, American musical instrument maker, inventor of the xaphoon
Carl Wittman (1943–1986), member of the national council of Students for a Democratic Society and activist for LGBT rights
Chris Wittman (born 1965), former Australian rules footballer
Don Wittman (1936–2008), Canadian sportscaster
Georg Michael Wittman (1760–1833), German Catholic bishop-elect
George Wittman (1857–1950), San Francisco Police chief of police
Greg Wittman (born 1947), American professional basketball player
Karl F. Wittman (1892-1981), American evangelist and composer
Patrizius Wittman (1818–1883), Catholic journalist
Randy Wittman (born 1959), American professional basketball player and coach
Robert J. "Rob" Wittman (born 1959), U.S. Representative for Virginia's 1st congressional district
Robert K. "Bob" Wittman (born 1955), FBI special agent, art-crime investigator
Ryan Wittman (born 1987), American basketball player for the Fort Wayne Mad Ants
Scott Wittman (born 1955), American director, lyricist, and writer
Stan Wittman (1901–1994), Australian rules footballer for Melbourne
Steve Wittman (1904–1995), American aviator and airplane designer
Therese Wittman (1869-1942), French composer
Tim Wittman (born 1963), American soccer player, currently assistant coach with the Johns Hopkins University women's soccer team
Trevor Wittman (born 1974), American boxing and MMA trainer
Walter Wittman, American newspaper editor and politician

See also
Wittman, Maryland, an unincorporated community in Maryland, United States
Wittmann
Whitman (disambiguation)